Mapa Group is a Turkish conglomerate founded by Mehmet Nazif Günal. They were formerly named MNG Group of Companies and MNG Şirketler Grubu Holding A.Ş. is the holding company of the group.

History

Günal Construction, the first company in the group, was founded in 1976 by Mehmet Nazif Günal, followed by Mapa Construction in 1978. The companies became a joint stock company in 1983. The first large-scale construction projects the company undertook were the Afşin Elbistan Power Plant, completed in 1982, the Kralkızı Dam in 1984, and the Hilton Izmir, which was constructed in 1992.

In 1996 the company expanded its operations into air cargo, and created MNG Airlines, followed by an expansion into tourism in 1999. In 2013, the company won the tender to construct the new Istanbul Airport, and in 2014 MNG finished construction on the Heydar Aliyev International Airport in Azerbaijan. In 2000, MNG finished construction a recreation of the Topkapı Palace as a beach resort in Antalya, followed by the Kremlin Palace Hotel, a reconstruction of St. Basil's Cathedral and the Moscow Kremlin on the Antalya beachfront, which was completed in 2003. The MNG Media Group launched TV8 in 1999, which was sold to Acun Ilıcalı and the Doğuş Group in 2013.

MNG's equity securities brokerage arm MNG Securities was purchased by the Lehman Brothers in 2007.

Mapa Construction completed a new terminal at Kotoka International Airport in Ghana in 2018, and has been constructing the Stade Abdelkader Khalef stadium in Tizi Ouzou, Algeria.

In 2020, MNG Group of Companies changed their name to Mapa Group.

Controversies

In 2015, Turkish media alleged that the MRG's sale of TV8 was at the request of Turkish president Recep Tayyip Erdoğan. The MNG Group has received controversy due to environmental concerns around hydroelectric dams, and the construction of Istanbul Airport, which involved the removal of 660,000 trees.

In August 2019, a security guard for Avesoro Resources, a member of MNG, killed a man illegally panning for gold at the Youga Gold Mine in Burkina Faso. The death led to locals rioting and attacking the mining facilities in retaliation the next day. Over 500 people at the mine had lost their jobs in 2019, and had been replaced by Turkish contractors.

An employee at Turkish private jet operator MNG Jet admitted to falsifying passenger records around the escape of Nissan executive Carlos Ghosn from Japan in December 2019, which used the company's planes. MNG filed a criminal complaint against the employee in January 2020, noting the two flights involved in his escape did not appear to be for the same client. On 8 May, Turkey charged seven people accused of helping Ghosn flee to Lebanon via Istanbul.

Companies

Construction
 Günal Construction
 Mapa Construction
 MNG Esmaş
 MNG Tesisat
 MNG Targem
 MNG Zemtaş

Tourism
 MNG Turizm
 MNG Bilet
 MNG Mice
 WOW Hotels

Air transportation
 MNG Airlines
 MNG Jet

Finance
 MNG Faktoring
 MNG Investment

Mining
 Avesoro Resources

References

External links
 

Companies based in Istanbul
Conglomerate companies established in 1976
Conglomerate companies of Turkey
Turkish companies established in 1976